Outrigger canoeing at the 2003 South Pacific Games was held from 30 June to 3 July 2003 on the Suva foreshore in Fiji. Tahiti dominated the competition winning all twelve gold medals.

Medal summary

Medal table

Men's results

Women's results

References

Outrigger canoeing at the Pacific Games
2003 South Pacific Games
Pacific Games